Maurice Bourget,  (October 20, 1907 – March 29, 1979) was a Canadian politician who was Speaker of the Senate of Canada from April 27, 1963 to January 6, 1966.

Bourget was born in Lauzon, Quebec and played semi-professional baseball and softball in Levis as a young man. He trained as a civil engineer and practiced in Levis.

A Liberal since the age of 19, Bourget was first elected to the House of Commons of Canada as a Liberal in 1940. Bourget and several other Quebec Liberal MPs had broken with their party the year before during the Conscription Crisis of 1944, quitting the Liberal caucus in order to oppose the government's decision to deploy National Resources Mobilization Act conscripts overseas. Previously, conscripts had only been used for "home defence" and kept within Canada. He ran and was re-elected as an "Independent Liberal" in 1945 defeating his only opponent, a Social Credit candidate.

Bourget reconciled with the Liberal Party in the post-war period and was again elected as a Liberal in 1949 and was re-elected in subsequent elections until his defeat in 1962 due to an upsurge in support for the Social Credit party.

As an MP, Bourget served as a delegate to the United Nations General Assembly in 1951. From 1953 to 1957 he served as parliamentary assistant to the Minister of Public Works.

He returned to parliament in 1963 when he was appointed to the Senate on the advice of the newly elected Liberal Prime Minister, Lester Pearson and was concurrently appointed Speaker of the upper house. As such, he also served as  Joint Chairman of the Canadian delegation to the meeting of the Canada-U.S.A. Inter parliamentary Group at Washington in January 1964 and Joint Chairman of the Inter parliamentary Conference held in Ottawa in September 1965.

Bourget stepped down as Speaker in January 1966 and was appointed to the Privy Council in February. He remained a Senator until his death in 1979.

References

External links
 
 Speakers of the Senate biography

1907 births
1979 deaths
Canadian senators from Quebec
Speakers of the Senate of Canada
Liberal Party of Canada MPs
Independent Liberal MPs in Canada
Liberal Party of Canada senators
Members of the House of Commons of Canada from Quebec
Members of the King's Privy Council for Canada